The 2008 Dublin Senior Football Championship is the inter club Gaelic football competition between the top teams in Dublin GAA. The 2008 competition opened with group stages. The first round of the group stages began on May 8, 2008. Kilmacud Crokes finished as the 2008 champions and went on to qualify for the Leinster Senior Club Football Championship first round against Celbridge. Tomas Quinn finished the season as highest scorer with 5-34 (0-24f, 0-1 sline 0-1 pen). Dublin Champions Kilmacud Crokes progressed from the Dublin championship to win both the Leinster Senior Club Football Championship and the All-Ireland Senior Club Football Championship.

Group stages
The winning team in each group qualify for a place in the quarter finals of the competition. The team that finish in second and third position go on to the Dublin Senior B Football Championship. The teams that finish on the bottom contend the relegation championship.

Group One

Fixtures

Group Two
Kilmacud Crokes went on to qualify for the quarter final of the Dublin Senior Football Championship while second place Round Towers and third place Raheny went on to the Dublin Senior B Football Championship. Naomh Olaf went on to fight for survival in the relegation playoffs.

Fixtures

Group Three

Fixtures

Group Four

Fixtures

Group Five

Fixtures

Group Six

Fixtures

Group Seven

Fixtures

Group Eight

Fixtures

Relegation playoff

Quarter-finals

Semi-finals + Final

Dublin Senior Football Final Replay

Dublin Senior B Championship
The Dublin Senior B Football Championship is at the Semi-final stage of the competition with 4 teams remaining.

References

External links
First round Results
Groupings for 2008 Competition

Dublin Senior Football Championship
Dublin Senior Football Championship